Birendra Kishore Roaza was a Tripuri social activist and politician who represented Chittagong Hill Tracts in the 1954 East Bengal Legislative Assembly election. He was the first indigenous candidate to 1954 East Bengal Legislative Assembly election for the indigenous people of Chittagong Hill Tracts

References

1913 births
1985 deaths
Tripuri people
Bangladeshi politicians
People from Khagrachhari District